Popotan is a 2003 anime series based on the visual novel of the same name produced by the company, Petit Ferret. The story follows three  girls, sisters Ai; Mai; and Mii; and their maid, Mea, as they travel through time without aging, along with the mansion they live in. One of the sisters occasionally gathers crucial intelligence from conversations with dandelions—referred to as popotan—as they search for the mysterious figure of Shizuku. Popotan is a play on the Japanese word for "dandelions", tanpopo. It was developed by Shaft, directed and storyboarded by Shinichiro Kimura, and written by Jukki Hanada. The characters were designed by Haruka Sakurai and originally created by Akio Watanabe, under the alias of Poyoyon Rock.

Twelve episodes were produced. They originally aired on Tokyo Broadcasting System's satellite station BS-i, from July 18, 2003 through October 3, 2003, and were also made available at the same time on the Bandai Channel. On August 27 and 28, 2003, an event with the first volume Japanese DVD of Popotan was shown Animate Ikebukuro in Japan. The event featured guest appearances by the anime's voice actress for the three sisters.

On June 27, 2003, a teaser DVD with character designs by Haruka Sakurai was released. The DVD,  contains video interviews with the anime's voice actors, a CD containing music to the radio drama's, theme , metallic paint illustrations and a plushie of Unagi. The anime was released on Japanese DVD by Bandai Visual in six discs of two episodes each. The set was released in staggered fashion between September 26, 2003 and February 25, 2004. Each disc also came with a promotional figurine of one of the girls. At the same time, Bandai released DVDs without the figurines at a lower cost. Geneon USA licensed the DVDs for North American release. Between December 7, 2004 and April 26, 2005, three DVDs were produced, each containing four episodes. A final box set was released on August 14, 2007, shortly before Geneon USA's demise. Sentai Filmworks, the licensing arm of ADV Films, announced that it had licensed the anime and would release the complete series in October 2009.

The Popotan anime has had one album and one extended play (EP) released. The album is the original soundtrack by Osamu Tezuka containing the television edited opening theme  by Under17 and the closing theme "Suki" by Funta. A joint EP, was released by Under17 and Funta which contained the unedited versions of both songs as well as a joint song, "Gem Stone", which has also been listed as a theme song for the anime. The opening theme was also released on Under17's greatest hits compilation, .



Episode list

Notes

References
General

Specific

Popotan
Episodes